The Embassy of Moldova in Bucharest is the diplomatic mission of Moldova to Romania. The embassy provides consular services to Moldova citizens residing or travelling in Romania, Serbia and Montenegro.

Overview
On 21 June 2010 Mihai Ghimpu signed a decree appointing Iurie Reniţă the new ambassador of Moldova in Romania.

See also
 Moldovan–Romanian relations
 List of diplomatic missions of Moldova

Gallery

References

External links
 Embassy of Moldova in Bucharest

Bucharest
Moldova
Moldova–Romania relations
1992 establishments in Romania
1992 in Romania